Buctzotz Municipality (Yucatec Maya: "dress made of hair") is one of the 106 municipalities in the Mexican state of Yucatán containing (543.45 km2) of land and is located roughly  northeast of the city of Mérida.
It contains several churches and a hospital, Centre de Salud Buctzotz, in the eastern part of the main town.

History
There is no accurate data on when the town was founded, but during the conquest, it became part of the encomienda system and Francisco de Montejo the Younger was the first encomendero.

Yucatán declared its independence from the Spanish Crown in 1821, and in 1825 the area was assigned to the coastal region partition of Izamal Municipality. In 1867 it was transferred to the Temax Municipality and in 1988 was confirmed as head of its own municipality.

In 1913, Buctzotz was the site of a battle of the revolutionary forces under the command of the General Juan Campos.

Governance
The municipal president is elected for a three-year term. The town council has seven councilpersons, who serve as Secretary and councilors of public works, public services, ecology, parks, public sanitation, nomenclature and cemeteries.

Communities
The head of the municipality is Buctzotz, Yucatán. There are 18 populated areas of the municipality which include Chuntzalam, Dzonot Sábila, Gran Lucha, Grano de Oro, Muldzonot, San Francisco, Santo Domingo, Unidad Juárez, and X-bec. The significant populations are shown below:

Local festivals
Every year from 8 to 11 January the town celebrates a festival in honor of the town patroness, the Immaculate Conception and hosts a pilgrimage in her honor between 22 and 30 August. There is also a fiesta held for Santa Clara from 13 to 25 August held annually.

Tourist attractions
 Church of San Isidro Labrador, built in the sixteenth century
 Chapel of the Immaculate Conception
 Cenote Aguas Leguas
 Cenote Álvarez I
 Cenote Álvarez II
 Cenote Azuelín 
 Cenote Azúl

References

Municipalities of Yucatán